Sri Aurobindo Institute of Education is a K-12 school based in Salt Lake City, Kolkata, India. It follows the syllabus of the Council for the Indian School Certificate Examinations. It is guided by the principles of Sri Aurobindo. It opened in 1983 with one campus in BK Block, and subsequently opened another campus in CL Block.
The school is recognized by the Education Department of the Government of West Bengal and is affiliated to the Council for the Indian School Certificate Examinations, New Delhi.

References

Primary schools in West Bengal
High schools and secondary schools in Kolkata
Schools affiliated with the Sri Aurobindo Ashram
Educational institutions established in 1983
1983 establishments in West Bengal